Greg McCortney (born May 30, 1974) is an American politician who has served in the Oklahoma Senate from the 13th district since 2016.

In October 2021, McCortney was promoted to Majority Leader of the Oklahoma Senate because former Majority Leader Kim David was term limited from the Senate in 2022 and retiring from the position.

Committee memberships

 Appropriations Subcommittee on Health & Human Services
 Business, Commerce & Tourism
 Health and Human Services – Vice Chair
 Rules – Chair
 Transportation

References

1974 births
21st-century American politicians
Living people
Republican Party Oklahoma state senators